This is a list of public holidays in Guyana.

Since 1957, September has been designated Amerindian Heritage Month. September 10 is considered Heritage Day, marking Guyana's first Amerindian Member of Parliament.

References

 
Guyana
Holidays